P3 Sessions by Dimmu Borgir were live recordings released in 2007.

Track listing
Intro
Progenies of the Great Apocalypse
Vredesbyrd
Sorgens Kammer - Del II
IndoctriNation
A Succubus in Rapture
The Serpentine Offering
The Chosen Legacy
The Insight And the Catharsis
Spellbound (By the Devil)
Mourning Palace

External links
Official Dimmu Borgir site

2007 live albums
Dimmu Borgir albums